Titan FC 30: Brilz vs. Magalhaes  was a mixed martial arts event, held on September 26, 2014, at the Cedar Park Center in Cedar Park, Texas.

Background
This event is headlined by former UFC vets Vinny Magalhães & Jason Brilz battling for the vacant Titan FC Light Heavyweight Championship. Originally this fight was scheduled to happen at Titan FC 28 but Magalhães was forced out of the fight due to a Staph Infection. 

Former UFC heavyweights Walt Harris & Dave Herman were originally scheduled to take place at this event but was cancelled due to Harris injuring his back.

Official fight card

See also
Titan Fighting Championships
List of Titan FC events
Titan FC events

References

2014 in mixed martial arts
Mixed martial arts in Texas
Sports competitions in Texas
2014 in sports in Texas